Alexandru Barbu (born March 8, 1945 in Peleu) is an alpine skier from Romania. He competed for Romania at the 2014 and 2018 Winter Olympics, in the slalom and giant slalom.

References 

1945 births
Living people
Sportspeople from Sibiu
Romanian male alpine skiers
Olympic alpine skiers of Romania
Alpine skiers at the 2014 Winter Olympics
Alpine skiers at the 2018 Winter Olympics